Carrick (also known as Carrigdrumruske or Carrick-on-Shannon Borough) was a constituency represented in the Irish House of Commons from 1614 to 1800. It returned two members.

Borough
This constituency was the borough of Carrick-on-Shannon in County Leitrim.

History
In the Patriot Parliament of 1689 summoned by James II, Carrick was not represented. Under the terms of the Act of Union 1800, the constituency was disenfranchised and abolished.

Members of Parliament, 1614–1801
1613–1615 Maurice Griffith and Thomas Bellot
1639–1649 Sir George St George and John Jackson
1661–1666 Richard Barrett and Thomas Carr

1689–1801

Notes

References

Bibliography

Constituencies of the Parliament of Ireland (pre-1801)
Historic constituencies in County Leitrim
1614 establishments in Ireland
1800 disestablishments in Ireland
Constituencies established in 1614
Constituencies disestablished in 1800